Mračaj Stadium is a multi-use stadium in Jajce, Bosnia and Herzegovina. It is the home ground of Premier League of Bosnia and Herzegovina side Metalleghe-BSI. The stadium has capacity of 4,300 spectators.

References 

m
Multi-purpose stadiums in Bosnia and Herzegovina